Wing Commander Roderick Alastair Brook Learoyd, VC (5 February 1913 – 24 January 1996) was a Royal Air Force bomber pilot and recipient of the Victoria Cross, the highest award for gallantry in the face of the enemy that can be awarded to British and Commonwealth forces.

Early life
Born in Folkestone on 5 February 1913 and educated at Hydneye House Preparatory School, Baldslow, Sussex, and Wellington College, Berkshire, Learoyd then attended the Chelsea College of Aeronautical and Automobile Engineering. Learoyd lived in Argentina for two years as a farmer.

RAF career
Learoyd decided to join the Royal Air Force (RAF) and was accepted in March 1936. He took a short service commission and was commissioned as an acting pilot officer on 18 May 1936. He was posted to No. 49 Squadron, Bomber Command equipped with Hawker Hinds at RAF Worthy Down, and was regraded and confirmed as a pilot officer on 23 March 1937. In March 1938, No. 49 Squadron moved to Scampton and became the first RAF squadron to re-equip with the new Handley Page Hampden bomber. Learoyd was promoted to flying officer on 23 December 1938.

Operational from the outbreak of the Second World War, on 3 September six Hampdens from No. 83 Squadron and three from No. 49 Squadron (including Learoyd) left Scampton on an "armed reconnaissance" sortie over the North Sea. During the next ten months Learoyd participated in 23 more bombing sorties, and was an acting flight lieutenant when the following deed took place for which he was awarded the VC, gazetted on 20 August 1940.

On 12 August 1940 eleven Hampdens – six from No. 49 Squadron, five from No. 83 Squadron – were detailed to destroy the old aqueduct carrying the canal over the river Ems, north of Münster. Flight Lieutenant Learoyd was one of the pilots briefed to bomb. Learoyd was detailed as pilot of Hampden P4403, "EA-M", and his crew comprised Pilot Officer John Lewis (Observer), Sergeant Walter Ellis (wireless operator-gunner) and Leading Aircraftman William Rich (ventral gunner).

Of the other Hampdens that made the attack that night, two were destroyed and two more were badly hit. Flight Lieutenant Learoyd took his plane into the target at only 150 feet, in the full glare of the searchlights and flak barrage all round him. After commencing its bombing run Learoyd's aircraft was badly damaged, including a ruptured hydraulic system, resulting in inoperable wing flaps and a useless undercarriage. Wing damage, though serious, had fortunately missed the wing petrol tanks. Despite this damage the bombs were duly dropped and Learoyd managed to get his crippled plane back to England where he decided that a night landing would be too dangerous for his crippled aircraft and so circled base until first light, finally safely landing without causing injury to his crew or further damage to his aircraft.

The Victoria Cross was awarded at an investiture on 9 September 1940, by which time Learoyd, taken off operations and promoted to substantive flight lieutenant, was acting temporarily as personal assistant to Air Chief Marshal Sir Sir Robert Brooke-Popham.

Victoria Cross citation

The announcement and accompanying citation for the decoration was published in a supplement to the London Gazette on 20 August 1940, reading:

Later career
Learoyd was promoted to squadron leader by 1942. He served in No. 44 Squadron for the remainder of the war. After surviving the war, Learoyd returned to civilian life, first as a VIP pilot and later as an export sales manager in the motor industry. He remained in the RAF reserves until 9 February 1958, when he retired with the rank of wing commander. His VC is on display in the Lord Ashcroft Gallery at the Imperial War Museum, London.

References

External links
Location of grave and VC medal (West Sussex)
Contemporary article about the action
Imperial War Museum Interview

1913 births
1996 deaths
People from Folkestone
Royal Air Force officers
British World War II pilots
British World War II bomber pilots
Royal Air Force personnel of World War II
Royal Air Force recipients of the Victoria Cross
British World War II recipients of the Victoria Cross
People educated at Wellington College, Berkshire
Military personnel from Kent